The 2017 Humpty's Champions Cup is the final Grand Slam of curling event of the 2016–17 curling season.

Men

Teams
The teams are listed as follows:

Round-robin standings

Tiebreakers

Playoffs

Quarterfinal

Semifinal

Final

Women

Teams
The teams are listed as follows:

Round-robin standings

Tiebreaker

Playoffs

Quarterfinal

Semifinal

Final

Qualification

Men

Women

Notes

References

Champions Cup (curling)
2017 in Canadian curling
Curling in Alberta
2017 in Alberta
Sport in Calgary
April 2017 sports events in Canada